Arturo "Dusty" Harrison Hernández (born May 21, 1994) is a Puerto Rican-American professional boxer. He is the former USBA and WBC Continental Americas welterweight champion.

In October 2013, Dusty was praised by Mike Tyson in an open letter Tyson sent to USA Boxing in response to their accusation that his promotion was hindering the growth of USA Boxing's future Olympic team by signing young amateurs. Tyson used Dusty's career along with the career of Hall of Famer Wilfred Benítez as well as his own as examples of successful fighters that turned professional as teenagers. Tyson also mentioned Dusty on Twitter, tweeting to him, "Dusty you are a true inspiration for amateurs looking to turn pro."

Prior to his first fight in 2014, Dusty was featured in Washington, D.C. lifestyle magazine, the Washingtonian. In the story, A Ring of His Own, Dusty's upbringing and career success are highlighted, as Dusty is described as "Washington’s best boxing prospect since Sugar Ray Leonard." Also in the article, undefeated two-division world champion Andre Ward said, "Dusty has the 'it' factor." On December 30, 2014, Dusty became the first boxer to sign with music superstar Jay-Z's Roc Nation Sports.

On December 2, 2015, Dusty signed a multi-year endorsement deal with sportswear company FILA. Dusty was supposed to have his first fight under the FILA brand on December 5, 2015, but after multiple opponents fell through including Canadian welterweight champion Steve Claggett (23–3–1, 16 KOs), the original opponent, his fight that was scheduled for HBO Latino was canceled at the last minute.

On January 27, 2016, Dusty signed a partnership deal with GEICO.

On June 15, 2018, Dusty was granted his release from Roc Nation Sports. "I am excited to have the opportunity to get back into the ring and fulfill my goal of becoming a world champion. I am in the gym and I am working hard to get back to where I was two years ago," Hernandez-Harrison said. "I just want to fight at this point; it’s been way too long".

On December 20, 2018, Dusty signed with Lee Baxter Promotions.

Amateur career
Dusty recalls watching old home movies of himself shadow boxing in a onesie when he was 10 months old. Dusty participated in his first boxing exhibition at the age of 6 at the historic Ritz Nightclub in Northwest, Washington, D.C. By the age of 8, Dusty was competing in sanctioned amateur matches and quickly amassed many championships. He won the 2010 National Silver Gloves Championships, three straight National Junior Golden Gloves Championships from 2007–2009 in which he won the Outstanding Boxer Award in 2008, and the Ringside World Championships, among others. Dusty finished his amateur career with a 167–30 record.

Professional career
At the age of 17, Dusty chose to forgo his amateur status and made history in his professional debut on June 11, 2011, when he became the youngest licensed professional fighter in the United States. In his first professional bout at the DeSoto Civic Center in Southaven, Mississippi, Dusty faced Alphonso Alexander, a man more than twice his age. Dusty won by a 40–36 shutout on all three judges’ scorecards. In his next bout in July, Dusty earned a unanimous decision victory over veteran Trenton Titsworth.

On December 10, 2011, Dusty made his highly anticipated Washington, D.C. debut, fighting on the Amir Khan vs. Lamont Peterson undercard on a HBO World Championship Boxing broadcast. In his first hometown professional bout, Dusty scored three knockdowns and a first-round TKO over Terrell Davis.

Dusty's successful first year in the professional ranks earned him 2011 Rookie of the Year honors from the world-renowned blog, Boxing Along The Beltway.

Dusty fought eight more times in 2012, including headlining cards in front of sellout crowds at the Walter E. Washington Convention Center in Washington, D.C. He was named 2012 Prospect of the Year by Stiff Jab. Dusty had a busy 2013, winning all eight of his fights and culminating in him being named an ESPN Super 20 Prospect as well as 2013 Prospect of the Year by Boxing Along The Beltway. He was also dubbed by International Boxing Organization President Ed Levine as a fighter that had the makings of a future world champion.

On February 8, 2013, Dusty scored a third-round stoppage win over former National Golden Gloves Champion Kelly Wright in Wilmington, Delaware. Prior to the bout with Kelly, Dusty sparred then undefeated junior welterweight world champion Danny García

Just two weeks later in Tunica, Mississippi, Dusty faced the durable Aaron Anderson and won every round en route to a six-round unanimous decision.

On April 12, 2013, Dusty fought for the first of three times at Dover Downs Hotel and Casino in Dover, Delaware. He won a unanimous decision against Puerto Rico's Jonathan Garcia, winning 60–54 on two of the judges' scorecards and 59–55 on the third.

On May 18, 2013, before a raucous hometown crowd of 3,000 fans that included Wale, Pierre Garçon, and Ty Lawson at the University of the District of Columbia, Dusty faced his toughest opponent to date, Eddie Soto (12–6), in a scheduled eight-round bout. Dusty dominated from the onset, dropping Soto with a picture-perfect right hand in the second round. He brought the fight to halt in the fifth round with a right hand that ultimately led the referee to stop the fight after Soto fell three times from the punch. Dusty proceeded to earn the "2013 Knockout of the Year" for the Soto fight and the "2013 Fighter of the Year" from Go Fight Live (GFL.tv).

A little over a month later on June 29, he defeated former WBO Africa Champion Ben Ankrah by unanimous decision on the Gennady Golovkin vs. Matthew Macklin undercard.

Dusty returned to Dover Downs on August 23 to fight Miami's Guillermo Valdes (12–4). In the second round, Dusty landed a double left-hook to the body and head that put his veteran opponent on the canvas. Dusty remained in control and the referee stopped the bout in the fourth round following a vicious barrage of punches along the ropes, bringing the crowd to its feet for their new "hometown" star.

Dusty won the WBC Youth Silver welterweight title on November 2, 2013, at The Theater at Madison Square Garden. He earned the belt by defeating Josh "Pit Bull" Torres (12–2–1) via ten-round unanimous decision on the Gennady Golovkin vs. Curtis Stevens undercard. Dusty earned scores of 100–90, and 98–92 (x2). Calling it "the kind of fight that [he] has always wanted," Dusty added, "I have always dreamed of fighting at Madison Square Garden, and for it to be for the WBC Youth Silver World Championship makes it that much more special. I appreciate the opportunities being provided to me and will continue to work hard and do my part." His father Buddy Harrison recalled his son's hard work and dedication following the WBC Youth Silver Welterweight World Championship fight: "I told Dusty nearly ten years ago in this very arena that if he worked hard and did the right things he could one day win a world title at Madison Square Garden. Tonight we made that dream a reality as we continue on our mission." Dusty has a "close-knit professional team" that includes his father and trainer, Buddy, cut-man Billy Briscoe, and matchmaker Mike Walters. A gracious competitor, Dusty appreciates his fans. Always making sure to recognize their continued support, at the Nov. 2 WBC Youth Silver World Championship Bout, Dusty noted, "It is really hard to put into words how much it means to me that my fans could share this special moment with me," as he greeted each one personally on the chartered buses of fans that made the trip from Washington, D.C. to support Dusty.

Just three weeks later on November 22, Dusty thrilled the Dover Downs crowd yet again as he scored three knockdowns en route to a first-round knockout of Marlon Lewis, ending Lewis' three-year unbeaten streak.

In his first live nationally televised bout on January 31, 2014, Dusty scored a decisive 78x74 victory on all three scorecards against Tim Witherspoon Jr. (10–3–1), the son of former two-time heavyweight world champion Tim Witherspoon, on ESPN Friday Night Fights. Calling it a "solid fight," following the match, Dusty Hernández-Harrison was trending on Twitter, indicative of his loyal fan base. HBO Boxing ringside judge Harold Lederman also acknowledged Dusty on Twitter, saying, "Congratulations Dusty. Once again, you looked terrific. This was a terrific, hard-fought win. Loved it." Actor Mark Wahlberg tweeted out to his three-million followers that Dusty is "the truth."

Five weeks later on March 7, 2014, Dusty was once again on ESPN Friday Night Fights, earning a hard-fought unanimous decision victory over Michael Balasi (10–3, 7 KOs), a hard-hitting southpaw. Dusty came off the canvas in round two showing his heart, determination and perseverance in flooring Balasi twice en route to the unanimous decision victory.

On May 17, 2014, in his first trip to West Virginia, Dusty dominated the dangerous Roberto Valenzuela, owner of 56 KOs, en route to a fourth-round TKO.

On July 26, 2014, Dusty got his first taste of the big room at Madison Square Garden as he won a shutout unanimous decision over another hard-hitting southpaw in Wifredo Acuna on the Gennady Golovkin vs. Daniel Geale undercard.

On November 1, 2014, Dusty made a successful hometown return. After 18 months gaining exposure fighting around the country, including twice on national TV, Dusty knocked out former National Golden Gloves champion, former world title challenger and Contender Season 2 contestant Michael Clark (44–11–1) in the first round in front of 2,900 exuberant fans at DAR Constitution Hall. "When I fight in other places, I don’t get to do this. I don’t get to come out and take pictures with everybody. It’s not as fun for the fans when they have to go to New York or have to go to Dover or all these other places. I really enjoy doing this," said Hernández-Harrison about fighting at home once again.

On January 9, 2015, Dusty became the WBC Continental Americas welterweight champion, capturing the previously vacant title by defeating Tommy Rainone (22–5–1) by scores of 100–90 twice and 99–91 live on Fox Sports 1 in the main event of Jay Z's Roc Nation Sports inaugural boxing event. Among the star-studded crowd of 4,253 at The Theater at Madison Square Garden were Jay Z, Rihanna, CC Sabathia, Jake Gyllenhaal, Rosie Perez, Carmelo Anthony, Victor Cruz, Andre Ward, Big Sean, Fabolous, Michael K. Williams, Bryant Jennings, Angie Martinez, DJ Mustard, Sam Dew, Santigold, Melanie Fiona, and Wardell. This was Dusty's third time fighting at the Mecca of Boxing, his first time headlining. His two previous appearances came on the undercards of Gennady Golovkin.

On April 17, 2015, at the Foxwoods Resort Casino, Dusty earned a shutout unanimous decision win over durable veteran Chris Gray.

On August 15, 2015, in Miami, Florida, Dusty dominated veteran Carlos Winston Velásquez from the opening bell. He landed a counter right hand that dropped Velásquez in the third round. He later forced Velásquez to retire on his stool after the fifth round due to an accumulation of brutal body shots, ending Velásquez's two-fight win streak.

A little over a month later on September 26 in Norfolk, Virginia against veteran James Wayka, Dusty scored the fastest knockout of his career, as it only took him 78 seconds to dispatch his opposition.

In his 2016 debut on January 29 in Elk Grove Village, Illinois, Dusty defeated the hard-hitting Angel Hernández via technical knockout as Hernández could not answer the bell for the third round due to an eye injury. Dusty earned his third consecutive stoppage victory.

On May 13 at the D.C. Armory, his first bout in his hometown since 2014, Dusty fought to a split draw against Mike Dallas Jr. (21–3–1). Both fighters thought they deserved the victory. "I thought I finished it great. I finished it way too strong with that knockdown [not to get the decision]. I feel I pulled it out with that late knockdown," Hernandez-Harrison said. "In my opinion, we won in his hometown convincingly," Dallas said.

Dusty spent five weeks leading up to the fight with Dallas in San Diego as a sparring partner for Mexican superstar Canelo Álvarez. He helped Álvarez get ready for his fight against Amir Khan as Dusty was brought in to mimic the blazing hand speed of Khan. He got more rounds with Álvarez than anyone else in camp, sparring some 50 rounds with the champ. The sparring seemed to help Álvarez as he won by an explosive one-punch knockout that rendered Khan unconscious in the sixth round.

In Dusty's biggest fight, which took place on September 15, 2016 at the 2300 Arena in Philadelphia on CBS Sports Network, he won a unanimous decision over Thomas LaManna (21–1) by scores of 98–92 and 97–93 (x2) to win the vacant USA welterweight title and earn himself a top 15 world ranking by the International Boxing Federation.

Dusty was supposed to make his long-awaited return on December 1, 2018 against James Winchester in the main event of the first boxing event at the brand new Entertainment and Sports Arena in his hometown of Washington, D.C. but had to pull out the week of the fight due to an injury. His return was then rescheduled to February 16, 2019, vs Ulises Jimenez at the Mountaineer Casino Ballroom in New Cumberland, West Virginia, but Jimenez failed to show up to the weigh-ins, a backup opponent would not be approved by the commission and the fight was canceled.

Dusty made his highly anticipated return to the ring after nearly three years on March 30, 2019 against Bruce Rumbolz at the Grand Theater in New Albany, Indiana. Dusty knocked out the grizzled veteran 1:46 into the first round with a left to the body followed by a left hook to the head that sent Rumbolz to the canvas.

On April 20 at the Rosecroft Raceway in Fort Washington, Maryland, Dusty stopped Fred Jenkins Jr. in the fourth round. He was able to use his jab effectively throughout the contest; the jab helped break Jenkins Jr.’s defense down. Dusty would put on the pressure in the fourth round and landed a four-punch combo that would drop Jenkins Jr. to the canvas, who was counted out at 2:17 mark.

On July 19 at the MGM National Harbor in Oxon Hill, Maryland, Dusty stopped Colombian fighter Juan De Angel in the seventh round. The fight served as the main undercard bout of a Top Rank on ESPN+ event headlined by rising star Teófimo López. Dusty showed patience early in the fight, using his jab and superior hand speed to outbox De Angel. In the fifth round, Dusty started letting his hands go more, hurting De Angel with left hooks to the body and right hands upstairs. Late in the seventh, Dusty unleashed a three punch combination that dropped De Angel. He beat the referee's count, but spit his mouthpiece out, indicating he did not want to continue and the ref waived the fight off at the 2:30 mark, much to the delight of Dusty's large contingent of fans who made the short trip from D.C.

Asked about his plans now that he’s back in the ring and active, Harrison said, "Mentally, I’m in the best place I’ve ever been. I plan on surpassing everything I ever did before in my career and taking it further this time."

On February 8, 2020, Dusty dropped Les Sherrington three times en route to a second-round knockout victory.

Dusty's next fight was supposed to be against Demetrius Andrade but the ten-round fight was canceled after Dusty tested positive for the novel coronavirus a week before the fight.

Professional boxing record

|-style="text-align:center; background:#e3e3e3;"
|style="border-style:none none solid solid; "|
|style="border-style:none none solid solid; "|Result
|style="border-style:none none solid solid; "|Record
|style="border-style:none none solid solid; "|Opponent
|style="border-style:none none solid solid; "|Type
|style="border-style:none none solid solid; "|Rounds
|style="border-style:none none solid solid; "|Date
|style="border-style:none none solid solid; "|Location
|style="border-style:none none solid solid; "|Notes
|- align=center
|35
|Win
|34–0–1
|align=left| Les Sherrington
|
|
|
|align=left|
|align=left|
|- align=center
|34
|Win
|33–0–1
|align=left| Juan De Angel
|
|
|
|align=left|
|align=left|
|- align=center
|33
|Win
|32–0–1
|align=left| Fred Jenkins Jr.
|
|
|
|align=left|
|align=left|
|- align=center
|32
|Win
|31–0–1
|align=left| Bruce Rumbolz
|
|
|
|align=left|
|align=left|
|- align=center
|31
|Win
|30–0–1
|align=left| Thomas LaManna
|
|
|
|align=left|
|align=left|
|- align=center
|30
|Draw
|29–0–1
|align=left| Mike Dallas Jr.
|
|
|
|align=left|
|align=left|
|- align=center
|29
|Win
|29–0
|align=left| Angel Hernandez
|
|
|
|align=left|
|align=left|
|- align=center
|28
|Win
|28–0
|align=left| James Wayka
|
|
|
|align=left|
|align=left|
|- align=center
|27
|Win
|27–0
|align=left| Carlos Velasquez
|
|
|
|align=left|
|align=left|
|- align=center
|26
|Win
|26–0
|align=left| Chris Gray
|
|
|
|align=left|
|align=left|
|- align=center
|25
|Win
|25–0
|align=left| Tommy Rainone
|
|
|
|align=left|
|align=left|
|- align=center
|24
|Win
|24–0
|align=left| Michael Clark
|
|
|
|align=left|
|align=left|
|- align=center
|23
|Win
|23–0
|align=left| Wilfredo Acuna
|
|
|
|align=left|
|align=left|
|- align=center
|22
|Win
|22–0
|align=left| Roberto Valenzuela
|
|
|
|align=left| 
|align=left|
|- align=center
|21
|Win
|21–0
|align=left| Michael Balasi
|
|
|
|align=left| 
|align=left|
|- align=center
|20
|Win
|20–0
|align=left| Tim Witherspoon Jr.
|
|
|
|align=left|
|align=left|
|- align=center
|19
|Win
|19–0
|align=left| Marlon Lewis
|
|
|
|align=left|
|align=left|
|- align=center
|18
|Win
|18–0
|align=left| Josh Torres
|
|
|
|align=left|
|align=left|
|- align=center
|17
|Win
|17–0
|align=left| Guillermo Valdes
|
|
|
|align=left|
|align=left|
|- align=center
|16
|Win
|16–0
|align=left| Ben Ankrah
|
|
|
|align=left|
|align=left|
|- align=center
|15
|Win
|15–0
|align=left| Eddie Soto
|
|
|
|align=left|
|align=left|
|- align=center
|14
|Win
|14–0
|align=left| Jonathan Garcia
|
|
|
|align=left|
|align=left|
|- align=center
|13
|Win
|13–0
|align=left| Aaron Anderson
|
|
|
|align=left|
|align=left|
|- align=center
|12
|Win
|12–0
|align=left| Kelly Wright
|
|
|
|align=left|
|align=left|
|- align=center
|11
|Win
|11–0
|align=left| Darrell Jones
|
|
|
|align=left|
|align=left|
|- align=center
|10
|Win
|10–0
|align=left| Nalo Leal
|
|
|
|align=left|
|align=left|
|- align=center
|9
|Win
|9–0
|align=left| Shane Gierke
|
|
|
|align=left|
|align=left|
|- align=center
|8
|Win
|8–0
|align=left| Marqs Jackson
|
|
|
|align=left|
|align=left|
|- align=center
|7
|Win
|7–0
|align=left| Reggie Nash
|
|
|
|align=left|
|align=left|
|- align=center
|6
|Win
|6–0
|align=left| Joey Ortega
|
|
|
|align=left|
|align=left|
|- align=center
|5
|Win
|5–0
|align=left| Anthony Bowman
|
|
|
|align=left|
|align=left|
|- align=center
|4
|Win
|4–0
|align=left| Booker Mullins
|
|
|
|align=left|
|align=left|
|- align=center
|3
|Win
|3–0
|align=left| Terrell Davis
|
|
|
|align=left|
|align=left|
|- align=center
|2
|Win
|2–0
|align=left| Trenton Titsworth
|
|
|
|align=left|
|align=left|
|- align=center
|1
|Win
|1–0
|align=left| Alphonso Alexander
|
|
|
|align=left|
|align=left|

References

External links

1994 births
Living people
American sportspeople of Puerto Rican descent
Boxers from Washington, D.C.
Welterweight boxers
American male boxers
Puerto Rican male boxers